The Goaldi Mosque is a mosque in the historic Bengali capital of Sonargaon. It was built during the Bengal Sultanate under the reign of Sultan Alauddin Hussain Shah. It is one of the few surviving medieval monuments in Sonargaon Upazila, Bangladesh.

History
The mosque was established in 1519. It was built by Mulla Hizabar Akbar Khan during the reign of Sultan Alauddin Husain Shah of Bengal at a place called Goaldi - half a mile northeast of Panam village in Sonargaon. Sonargaon was a Mint Town of the Bengal Sultanate and often served as a royal capital. The Sultans often launched raids into Assam, Tripura and Arakan from Sonargaon. The town was the principal administrative center of eastern Bengal, particularly the Bhati region. The area falls under present-day Narayanganj District, Bangladesh. The mosque is of the more elegant and ornate sultanate-era mosques in the country.

Architectural features

The Goaldi mosque is a good example of the 'enclosed square type' mosque of Bengal that is distinguished by a cubical prayer chamber with corner towers and entrances on all sides except the qibla wall. A single dome caps the mosque; engaged ribbed turrets define the four corners; and the cornice is gently sloped. Circular corner towers are a deviation from the usual octagonal corner towers. This is the only example of circular corner towers in the Dhaka district. Accentuating the cornice is a row of small niches with floral motifs inside.

The east facade has three arched openings, embellished on either sides with rectangular panels of delicate relief work in the form of a niche with an ornamental hanging lamp motif. The north and south facades similarly display three arches, though only the center arch is open while the two side arches are blind.

The cubical prayer chamber measures 7.57 m and the walls are 2 m thick. The dome is carried on squinches that spring from the tops of stone pilasters, two on each wall. The qibla wall has three mihrabs. The use of black basalt for the central mihrab was a common practice during the sixteenth century. It is decorated with beautiful, intricate patterns composed of an ornamental hanging lamp motif. The two flanking mihrabs are decorated in similar fashion but instead of black basalt they are made of brick and fine terra cotta work. Lotus motifs are found carved in the spandrels and are closely related to the lotuses held by the Hindu god, Surya.

Present condition
The condition of mosque had deteriorated: with the exception of the qibla wall the entire mosque had collapsed, including the dome. Careful restoration was executed by the Department of Archaeology and Museums and this small graceful mosque is now restored to resemble its original design.

References

 Ahmed, Nazimuddin. 1984. Discover the monuments of Bangladesh. Dhaka: University Press Limited, 155, 156. 
 Asher, Catherine B. 1984. Inventory of Key Monuments. Art and Archaeology Research Papers: The Islamic Heritage of Bengal. Paris: UNESCO, 133. 
 Hasan, Syed Mahmudul. 1984. Classification of Mosques According to Ground Plan. Art and Archaeology Research Papers: The Islamic Heritage of Bengal. Paris: UNESCO, 141, 144. 
 Hasan, Perween. 1984. Eight Sultanate Mosques in Dhaka District. Art and Archaeology Research Papers: The Islamic Heritage of Bengal. Paris: UNESCO, 186.
 Munshi Rahman Ali Tayesh with translation by Dr. A.M.M Sharfuddin. Tawarikh-e-Dhaka.

External links

 http://www.lonelyplanet.com/bangladesh/dhaka-division/sonargaon/sights/religious/goaldi-mosque-3-1431675
 https://web.archive.org/web/20130225164604/http://archnet.org/library/sites/one-site.jsp?site_id=7184 Images
 https://web.archive.org/web/20080930184605/http://www.kaladarshana.com/sites/dhaka/IMG00063.html 
 http://www.thedailystar.net/2003/11/10/heritage.htm

Mosques completed in 1519
Bengal Sultanate mosques
Mosques in Dhaka